Jackson Kiprop (born 20 October 1986) is a Ugandan long distance runner who specialises in the marathon. He competed in the marathon event at the 2015 World Championships in Athletics in Beijing, China.

References

External links
 

1986 births
Living people
Ugandan male long-distance runners
Ugandan male marathon runners
World Athletics Championships athletes for Uganda
Place of birth missing (living people)
20th-century Ugandan people
21st-century Ugandan people